A New Prologue to the Shahnameh is an unproduced screenplay by Bahram Beyzai, written in 1986 and first published in 1990. It consists of an imaginary account of the life and times of Ferdowsi.

Abdolali Dastgheib praised the book in an extensive review and, later, among others, Soheila Najm studied it in a series of articles.

In English
An English translation appeared in 2008 in an anthology named Sohrab's Wars:
 Khorrami, Mohammad Mehdi and Pari Shirazi. Sohrab's Wars: Counter Discourses of Contemporary Persian Fiction, A Collection of Short Stories and a Film Script. Costa Mesa: Mazda Publishers, 2008. ISBN 978-1-56859-224-4

See also
 Ferdowsi (film)

References
 Khorrami, Mohammad Mehdi. Literary Subterfuge and Contemporary Persian Fiction: Who Writes Iran? London: Routledge. 2015.
 دست‌غیب، عبدالعلی. "فیلمنامه: دیباچهٔ نوین شاهنامه." چیستا. 1992.
 نجم، سهیلا. "بررسی فیلمنامه‌ی دیباچه‌ی نوین شاهنامه: مجموعه‌یی از نشانه‌ها و تمثیل‌ها در ارتباط با دنیای ذهنی نویسنده." نقد سینما. 2009.

External links
 

Unproduced screenplays
Works by Bahram Beyzai